Toufik Rouabah (born 6 May 1970) is an Algerian football manager.<ref>

References

1970 births
Living people
Algerian football managers
MC Saïda managers
CA Batna managers
CA Bordj Bou Arréridj managers
Al-Taawoun FC managers
Ettifaq FC managers
Olympique de Médéa managers
Algerian Ligue Professionnelle 1 managers
Algerian expatriate football managers
Expatriate football managers in Saudi Arabia
Algerian expatriate sportspeople in Saudi Arabia
21st-century Algerian people